The 1986 AFC Youth Championship was held from 1 to 10 December 1986 in Riyadh, Saudi Arabia. The tournament was won for the first time by Saudi Arabia in the finals against Bahrain.

Qualification

Qualified teams
  (Group 1 winners / hosts)
  (Group 2 winners)
  (Group 3 winners)
  (Group 4 winners)
  (Group 5 winners)
  (Group 6 winners)
  (Group 7 winners)
  (Group 8 winners)

Group stage

Group A

Group B

Knockout stage

Semifinal

Third-place match

Final

Winner

 Saudi Arabia, Bahrain qualified for 1987 FIFA World Youth Championship.

1986
1986
Youth
1986–87 in Saudi Arabian football
1986 in youth association football